Online ticket brokering is the resale of tickets through a web-based ticket brokering service. Prices on ticket brokering websites are determined by demand, availability, and the ticket reseller. Tickets sold through an online ticket brokering service may or may not be authorized by the official seller. Generally, the majority of trading on ticket brokering websites concerns itself with tickets to live entertainment events whereby the primary officially licensed seller's supply has been exhausted and the event has been declared "sold-out". This "sold-out" status increases the ticket's potential market value. Critics of the industry compare the resale of tickets online to ‘ticket touting’, ‘scalping’ or a variety of other terms for the unofficial sale of tickets directly outside the venue of an event.

The late 1990s and early 2000s saw the emergence of online ticket brokering as a lucrative business. Corporate ticket reselling firm Ticketmaster developed a strong online presence, dominating the online market. But, by 2006 Ticketmaster's stranglehold on the industry loosened with the emergence of other online ticket brokering companies, such as StubHub who won Major League Baseball's ticket resale business over Ticketmaster. 

Securities analyst Joe Bonner, who tracks Ticketmaster's parent company New York-based IAC/InterActiveCorp, told USA Today: "You have to look at the secondary market as something that is a real threat to Ticketmaster. They missed the boat. StubHub has been around a few years now already. They weren't as proactive as they probably should have been."

Eric Baker, founder and CEO of Viagogo.com, a European ticket resale website has described the loosening of Ticketmaster's grip on the market as "the equivalent in the ticketing industry of the fall of the Roman Empire".

By 2008 Internet ticket fraud had emerged as global problem, when fake ticket websites defrauded millions of dollars from sports fans by selling Beijing Olympics tickets which they had no intention of delivering.

Online Ticket Brokering Today

Due to the success of the secondary sale of tickets on the web, the line between ‘official’ (primary) ticket sellers and online ticket brokers (secondary sellers) has blurred. The two are now competing directly on a relatively level playing field: the internet.

Signs of Change

Signs of the new, mature online ticket business are cropping up. 

Consultancy and training firms are increasingly focusing on this ‘cleaning up’ trend. Events such as Ticket Summit 2008 in the US, held by the Better Ticketing Association, are becoming more and more common. A look at the program for this congress gives a good idea of the key indicators on the agenda of ‘professionalizing’ online ticket brokering. Topics include: ‘Getting Legal’, ‘Media Relations’ and ‘Building Your Base: The Lost Art of Customer Service’. There are similar conferences in the UK, such as the ‘Ticket Touting: Going, Going…Gone?’ conference held in London on 19 March 2008. Live UK Summit is another event that draws together ticketing agencies and other sectors involved in the live entertainment industry together in an open discussion forum. 

Another sign of change is the increasing legitimization of the internet as a free market environment for entrepreneurs, with plenty of online ticket broker communities sprouting up in recent years. Many states in the US are repealing laws against ticket reselling. Five states have made the resale of tickets legal in 2007, with a Missouri senator stating, ‘It makes no sense that we would turn people into criminals for simply wanting to resell a ticket […].’ 

While the internet is becoming an increasingly safer place to shop, it is still not the place for the overcautious buyer. Online ticket brokering is legal in most countries, such as the UK and other European countries, and it is a profitable business venture. Venue owners and secondary ticket sellers debated this issue at the ‘Ticket Touting: Going, Going…Gone?’ conference held in London on 19 March 2008, concluding that, for the time being, ticket resale is a legal and acceptable practice in the UK.  This seems to suggest that ticket reselling is increasingly ‘above board’, forcing online brokers to promise their customers the same service expected from primary sellers. This overall sea change presents a real challenge to corporate strongholds and is forcing sellers on both sides to try new things.

References

Retailers by type of merchandise sold
Tickets
E-commerce